Kraczewice Prywatne  is a village in the administrative district of Gmina Poniatowa, within Opole Lubelskie County, Lublin Voivodeship, in eastern Poland.

The village has a population of 1,000.

References

Kraczewice Prywatne